Melstone is a rural small town in far eastern Musselshell County, Montana, United States, along U.S. Route 12. The population was 126 at the 2020 census.  The town was established in 1908 as a base for operating crews on the Chicago, Milwaukee, St. Paul and Pacific Railroad, then under construction in Montana.  Although the railroad was abandoned in 1980, Melstone survives as a community center for farmers and ranchers in the lower Musselshell River valley.  It has a K-12 school with a staff of 16, which in the Fall of 2017 successfully began a 4-day school week.

The Melstone Oil Field west of town developed in the 1950s and saw renewed production in the 1990s.

Geography
Melstone is located at  (46.599081, -107.869851).

Climate
According to the Köppen Climate Classification system, Melstone has a semi-arid climate, abbreviated "BSk" on climate maps.

Demographics

2010 census
As of the census of 2010, there were 96 people, 52 households, and 24 families residing in the town. The racial makeup of the town was 96.9% White, 2.1% African American, and 1.0% from two or more races. Hispanic or Latino of any race were 1.0% of the population.

There were 52 households, of which 19.2% had children under the age of 18 living with them; 40.4% were married couples living together, 3.8% had a female householder with no husband present, 1.9% had a male householder with no wife present, and 53.8% were non-families. 51.9% of all households were made up of individuals, and 28.8% had someone living alone who was 65 years of age or older. The average household size was 1.85 and the average family size was 2.79.

The median age in the town was 50 years. 20.8% of residents were under the age of 18; 3.3% were between the ages of 18 and 24; 17.7% were from 25 to 44; 33.2% were from 45 to 64; and 25% were 65 years of age or older. The gender makeup of the town was 46.9% male and 53.1% female.

2000 census
As of the census of 2000, there were 136 people, 56 households, and 38 families residing in the town. The population density was 198.8 people per square mile (77.2/km2). There were 87 housing units at an average density of 127.2 per square mile (49.4/km2). The racial makeup of the town was 95.59% White, 0.74% Native American, 0.74% Asian, 1.47% from other races, and 1.47% from two or more races. Hispanic or Latino of any race were 1.47% of the population.

There were 56 households, out of which 28.6% had children under the age of 18 living with them, 53.6% were married couples living together, 10.7% had a female householder with no husband present, and 32.1% were non-families. 30.4% of all households were made up of individuals, and 16.1% had someone living alone who was 65 years of age or older. The average household size was 2.43 and the average family size was 3.03.

In the town, the population was spread out, with 25.7% under the age of 18, 6.6% from 18 to 24, 25.0% from 25 to 44, 27.2% from 45 to 64, and 15.4% who were 65 years of age or older. The median age was 41 years. For every 100 females there were 86.3 males. For every 100 females age 18 and over, there were 90.6 males.

The median income for a household in the town was $31,250, and the median income for a family was $33,438. Males had a median income of $36,250 versus $12,083 for females. The per capita income for the town was $15,027. There were no families and 5.8% of the population living below the poverty line, including no under eighteens and 10.7% of those over 64.

Current events
In 2006, Melstone made history by winning the State Boys Basketball Championship, being the smallest school ever to win.  The Melstone Broncs defeated the defending state champion Gardiner Bruins in an overtime win. The Broncs won 83-78 for the Class C boys basketball crown at MetraPark Arena in Billings, Montana.

2008 marked the town's centennial.

Education
Melstone Public Schools educates students from kindergarten through 12th grade. Melstone High School's team name is the Broncs.

Notable residents
 Evelyn Genevieve Sharp, early American aviator.

References

Towns in Musselshell County, Montana
1908 establishments in Montana
Populated places established in 1908